Tolloid-like protein 2 is a protein that in humans is encoded by the TLL2 gene.

This gene encodes an astacin-like zinc-dependent metalloprotease and is a subfamily member of the metzincin family. Unlike other family members, a similar protein in mice does not cleave procollagen C-propeptides or chordin.

References

Further reading